El Niño and More Purple Than Black are two names for the same Phil Lewis solo album.

Track listing
 No Sell Out
 How Low Can You Go
 Access Denied
 Close Your Eyes
 Not What You Take
 I Don't Think So
 Could Not Live Without You
 Tuesday
 Trust
 Slave To Now
 Just Got Back
 I Stand Accused
 Old Flames
 Carrying On
 Not What You Take (Acoustic Mix)
 Trust (Acoustic Mix)
 I Stand Accused (Acoustic Mix)

1999 debut albums
Phil Lewis albums